Stefan Peter (born 17 November 1964) is a German swimmer. He competed in three events at the 1984 Summer Olympics for West Germany.

References

External links
 

1964 births
Living people
German male swimmers
Olympic swimmers of West Germany
Swimmers at the 1984 Summer Olympics
Sportspeople from Mannheim